Sergei Mureiko (born 2 July 1970) is a retired heavyweight Greco-Roman wrestler, who until 1996 represented Moldova and then Bulgaria. He competed in the 1996, 2000 and 2004 Olympics and won a bronze medal in 1996. Between 1993 and 2004 he won 11 medals at the world and European championships, often losing to his main rival Aleksandr Karelin. He won his only international title in 1997, in the absence of Karelin. Karelin considered Mureiko his most difficult opponent, and believed that he had much luck in their bouts.

References

External links
 

1970 births
Living people
Sportspeople from Chișinău
Moldovan male sport wrestlers
Olympic wrestlers of Moldova
Olympic wrestlers of Bulgaria
Wrestlers at the 1996 Summer Olympics
Wrestlers at the 2000 Summer Olympics
Bulgarian male sport wrestlers
Wrestlers at the 2004 Summer Olympics
Olympic bronze medalists for Moldova
Olympic medalists in wrestling
Naturalised citizens of Bulgaria
Medalists at the 1996 Summer Olympics
European Wrestling Championships medalists